Middishade Clothing Factory, also known as the C.C. Knight Factory, is a historic factory located in the Franklintown section of Philadelphia, next to the former Harrington Machine Shop. Built in 1908, it is a six-story, reinforced concrete building faced in brick and terra cotta.  It housed the Middishade Clothing Company until 1986. The building was subsequently converted to office usage and houses the regional office of the U.S. Citizenship and Immigration Services.

It was added to the National Register of Historic Places in 1986.

References

Industrial buildings and structures on the National Register of Historic Places in Philadelphia
Industrial buildings completed in 1908
1908 establishments in Pennsylvania
Textile mills in the United States